The Forbidden Garden may refer to:
The Forbidden Garden (Novel), a science fiction novel by author John Taine
Forbidden Corner, A garden in Yorkshire, England 
The imperial garden, the garden of the Forbidden City in Beijing